Idrinsky District is an administrative and municipal district (raion), one of the forty-three in Krasnoyarsk Krai, Russia. It is located in the southwest of the krai and borders with Balakhtinsky District in the north, Kuraginsky District in the east and south, and with Krasnoturansky District in the west. Its administrative center is the rural locality (a selo) of Idrinskoye. Population:  15,399 (2002 Census);  The population of Idrinskoye accounts for 41.2% of the district's total population.

History
The district was founded on April 4, 1924.

Government
The Head of the District and the Chairman of the District Council is Anatoly G. Bukatov.

References

Notes

Sources

Districts of Krasnoyarsk Krai
States and territories established in 1924